Dish Dogs is a 2000 American romantic comedy film. It stars Sean Astin and Matthew Lillard and was directed by Robert Kubilos. The film is about the relationship between two friends and when they find love they must both go their separate ways.

Cast
 Sean Astin as Morgan
 Matthew Lillard as Jason
 Brian Dennehy as Frost
 Shannon Elizabeth as Anne
 Maitland Ward as Molly
 Richard Moll as Dewitt
 Steven Martini as David (credited as Steve Martini)
 David Harris as Shane
 E.J. Callahan as Earl
 Steve Franken as Pastor
 Marcelo Tubert as Roberto
 George Gray as Aaron
 Sam Shamshak as Dean Berkowitz
 Herschel Sparber as E.J.
 Brad Braeden as Troy
 Lorissa McComas as Susan
 Kimber West as Bridget
 Jamie Anderson as Tiffany
 Claudia Pichardo as Karen
 Sonya Eddy as Outback Waitress
 Kelly Allee as Leggy Waitress (credited as Sean LaSure)
 Catherine Anderson as Baby Doll Dancer
 Shawna Anderson as Baby Doll Dancer
 Jamaica Charley as Baby Doll Dancer
 C.C. Costigan as Baby Doll Dancer (credited as Katie Colburn)
 Diva as Baby Doll Dancer
 Tamela Hulett as Baby Doll Dancer
 Chona Jason as Baby Doll Dancer
 Linda O'Neil as Baby Doll Dancer
 Tracy Rasmussen as Baby Doll Dancer
 Chanel Ryan as Baby Doll Dancer
 Shannon Frank as Cocktail Waitress (uncredited)
 Leah Jediny as Sexy Waitress (uncredited)

Reception
Nathan Rabin of The A.V. Club gave the film a negative review and wrote: "Funny only when it attempts to be serious [...] Dish Dogs should, but sadly won't, kill off the angst-ridden Gen-X comedy once and for all."

Godfrey Cheshire of Variety called the film "lightweight but agreeable" and predicted it would find an audience when released on video.

References

External links
 
 
 

2000 films
2000 direct-to-video films
2000 independent films
2000 romantic comedy films
2000s English-language films
Films shot in California
Films shot in Los Angeles
American independent films
American romantic comedy films
Films directed by Robert Kubilos
2000s American films